Émile Engel (5 April 1889 – 14 September 1914) was a French professional road bicycle racer. In the 1914 Tour de France he won stage 3, and was disqualified after stage 8 when he was involved in a fight with a race official. Only three months later he was killed in World War I.

Major results

1910
Tour de France des Indépendants:
 Winner stage 10
1911
Tour de France des Indépendants:
 Winner stage 12
1914
Tour de France:
Winner stage 3

References

External links 

Official Tour de France results for Emile Engel

French male cyclists
1889 births
1914 deaths
French Tour de France stage winners
Sportspeople from Colombes
French military personnel killed in World War I
Cyclists from Île-de-France